This is a list of the 100+ largest extant and historic houses in the United States, ordered by area of the main house. The list includes houses that have been demolished, houses that are currently under construction, and buildings that are not currently, but were previously used as private homes.

Largest houses

See also 
 List of Gilded Age mansions
 List of largest houses in the Los Angeles metropolitan area

References 

Houses, United States

Houses